MNC Sports is an Indonesian satellite and cable sports television channel owned by Media Nusantara Citra. The in-house channel was launched on 5 September 2005, making it considered as the first sports channel in the country. The channel is available on satellite providers MNC Vision and K-Vision, as well as MNC Play, and Vision+. History 

Vision 1 The Football Channel (later Vision 1 Sports) began on 5 September 2005. At first, Vision 1 – which can be seen through the channel 1 Indovision, only broadcast soccer games from around the world live. Since August 2007, it also presented impressions of extreme sports and badminton.

In each match live, broadcast was done directly from the studio to bring Vision1 with the presenter and commentator for the match to guide the way.

On November 2, 2011, Vision 1 Sports was rebranded into MNC Sports.

Current Programming
BWF World Tour (selected tournaments only, including Indonesia Open and Masters; shared with SPOTV)
FFI
Indonesia Pro Futsal League
Indonesia Nusantara Futsal League
FFI Championship
Formula E (licensed from SPOTV)
 Southeast Asian Games (2011, 2019 until 2023)

Football (as Soccer Channel) 
FIFA World Cup qualification (AFC (until 2022) and UEFA (2016 until 2017 and 2025 until 2026))
AFC
AFC Asian Cup
AFC U-23 Asian Cup
AFC U-20 Asian Cup
AFC U-17 Asian Cup
AFC Futsal Asian Cup
AFC U-20 Futsal Asian Cup
AFC Women's Asian Cup
AFC U-20 Women's Asian Cup
AFC U-17 Women's Asian Cup
AFC Women's Futsal Asian Cup
AFC Champions League
AFC Cup
AFC Futsal Club Championship
AFF
AFF Championship (2008 until 2024)
AFF Futsal Championship
AFF Futsal Cup
K League 1
K League 2
Saudi Professional League
Saudi King's Cup
Saudi Super Cup
Thai League 1
RFEF
Copa del Rey
Supercopa de España

 UEFA (2022-23 until 2027-28)
 Nations League
 UEFA Euro qualifiers

Former Programming
2010 FIFA World Cup
2018 FIFA World Cup
Liga 1
Liga 2
J1 League (licensed from SPOTV in 2022)
Serie A (discontinued)
Bundesliga (discontinued)
La Liga (discontinued)
Piala Indonesia
NBA
ATP Masters 1000
ATP World Tour 500 series
French Open
US Open (tennis)

References

External links 
 

Sports television in Indonesia
Television stations in Indonesia
Television channels and stations established in 2005
Television channels and stations disestablished in 2011
Media Nusantara Citra